Diogenes, feminine form Diogenissa (Διογένισσα), plural: Diogenoi (meaning "two-blooded"), was a Cappadocian Greek noble family of the Byzantine military aristocracy that provided several prominent generals and three emperors during the 10th and 11th century. Romanos IV Diogenes was a noted general, who by marriage to Eudokia Makrembolitissa, was Byzantine Emperor between 1068 and 1071. Diogenes led the Byzantine army for the pivotal defeat at the Battle of Manzikert in 1071.

References

Sources